Moustakas is a Greek surname. Notable people with the surname include:

Clark Moustakas (1923–2012), American psychologist
Mike Moustakas (born 1988), American baseball player
Sotiris Moustakas (1940–2007), Greek/Cypriot comedy actor
Spyros Moustakas (1914–2002), Greek writer
Theodore Moustakas, American engineer

Greek-language surnames
Surnames